Vernon Eugene Burke (born April 30, 1941) is a former American football tight end who played five seasons in the NFL with the San Francisco 49ers, Atlanta Falcons, and the New Orleans Saints.

High school career
Burke attended North High School in Bakersfield, California and starred in football.

College career
Burke attended Bakersfield College before he enrolled at Oregon State to play football.  He lettered in football in 1961 and 1962, earning a spot as a first-team Consensus All-American at split end in 1962.  Burke caught 69 passes for 1,007 yards, both NCAA records at the time.  The Beavers finished 9–2 after a 6–0 victory over Villanova in the Liberty Bowl.  The Beavers' lone touchdown in that game came on a 99-yard rushing touchdown by Beaver quarterback and 1962 Heisman Trophy winner, Terry Baker.

For his achievements in his senior season, Burke was chosen to play in the 1963 East-West Shrine Game and 1963 Hula Bowl.  Burke was also awarded the 1963 W.J. Voit Memorial Trophy as the outstanding football player on the Pacific Coast.

Professional career
Burke was drafted in the 5th round of the 1963 NFL Draft, the 64th pick overall, by the San Francisco 49ers.  Burke did not debut in the NFL however until 1965.  He later spent a year each with the Atlanta Falcons and the New Orleans Saints.

Legacy
Burke was inducted into the State of Oregon Sports Hall of Fame in 1982 and the Oregon State University Sports Hall of Fame in 1991.

References

External links
 Oregon State University Sports Hall of Fame

1941 births
Living people
People from San Luis Obispo, California
All-American college football players
Oregon State Beavers football players
San Francisco 49ers players
Atlanta Falcons players
New Orleans Saints players